The Dish Show is a Canadian television panel show, which aired on The Comedy Network in 1997 and 1998. Hosted by Maureen Holloway and Brigitte Gall, the series featured a rotating panel of female comedians.

The series garnered a Gemini Award nomination for Best Comedy Program or Series at the 13th Gemini Awards in 1998.

References

1997 Canadian television series debuts
1998 Canadian television series endings
1990s Canadian comedy television series
CTV Comedy Channel original programming